Amata magnopupillata is a moth of the family Erebidae. It was described by Emilio Berio in 1941 and is found in Eritrea.

References

External Links 
 Arctiidae genus list at Butterflies and Moths of the World of the Natural History Museum

Endemic fauna of Eritrea
magnopupillata
Moths described in 1941
Moths of Africa